Henry Spencer, 1st Earl of Sunderland, 3rd Baron Spencer of Wormleighton (c. 23 November 1620 – 20 September 1643), known as The Lord Spencer between 1636 and June 1643, was an English peer, nobleman, and politician from the Spencer family who fought and died in the English civil war on the side of the Cavaliers.

Life 
Henry was born at Althorp to William Spencer, 2nd Baron Spencer of Wormleighton and Lady Penelope Wriothesley, daughter of Henry Wriothesley, 3rd Earl of Southampton, and was baptised on 23 November 1620 at Great Brington church. He attended Magdalen College, Oxford and graduated from there with a Master of Arts degree on 31 August 1636. He then succeeded to his father's title of Baron Spencer later that year on 19 December 1636.

Family
 
On 20 July 1639 at Penshurst, he married Lady Dorothy Sidney, daughter of Robert Sidney, 2nd Earl of Leicester at Penshurst Place. It was generally believed to be a love marriage and had his father-in-law's warm approval: after Sunderland's death, her father consoled Dorothy by reminding her of her happy marriage, which he was happy to have helped bring about. Sunderland and his wife had three children:

Lady Dorothy Spencer (1640–1670), married George Savile, 1st Marquess of Halifax and had issue.
Robert Spencer, 2nd Earl of Sunderland (1641–1702)
Lady Penelope Spencer (c. 1642–1667), died unmarried.

Death 

Henry fought in the Battle of Edgehill in 1642 and was rewarded for his services on 8 June 1643 by being created 1st Earl of Sunderland (although the title cost him £3,000). He then fought in the Siege of Gloucester in August 1643 and the First Battle of Newbury on 20 September 1643, where he was killed, aged 22, by a cannonball. Cokayne writes that "he was, according to Clarendon, ''a lord of a great fortune, tender years ... and an early judgment; who, having no command in the army, attended upon the King's person under the obligation of honour; and putting himself that day into the King's troop a volunteer, before they came to charge was taken away by a cannon bullet.'"

Ancestry

References

1620 births
1643 deaths
Cavaliers
English military personnel killed in action
Earls of Sunderland
Henry Spencer, 1st Earl of Sunderland
People killed in the English Civil War